Northwest Outpost (also known as End of the Rainbow) is a 1947 American Musical Western film directed by Allan Dwan and starring Nelson Eddy and Ilona Massey. The film was Eddy's last, and is an operetta film like his previous starring roles. He was persuaded to make it by Republic Pictures because Rudolf Friml was writing the score. It was well received by critics and had a strong box office performance.

Plot
The film is set at the Russian imperial post at Fort Ross in California in the early Nineteenth Century. A visiting American army officer becomes romantically involved with an aristocratic woman whose criminal husband is being held as a prisoner at the Fort.

Cast
 Nelson Eddy as Captain Jim Laurence 
 Ilona Massey as Natalia Alanova 
 Joseph Schildkraut as Count Igor Savin 
 Elsa Lanchester as Princess 'Tanya' Tatiana 
 Hugo Haas as Prince Nickolai Balinin 
 Lenore Ulric as Baroness Kruposny 
 Peter Whitney as Volkoff Overseer 
 Tamara Shayne as Olga Natalia's Maid 
 Ernő Verebes as Kyril Balinin's Aide
 George Sorel as Baron Kruposny 
 Rick Vallin as Dovkin
 The American G.I. Chorus as Prisoners

See also
 List of American films of 1947

References

External links

1947 films
1940s historical musical films
American historical musical films
American Western (genre) films
1947 Western (genre) films
Films directed by Allan Dwan
Films set in California
Films set in the 1830s
Films set in the 19th century
Republic Pictures films
Operetta films
Films scored by Rudolf Friml
American black-and-white films
1940s English-language films
1940s American films